Ogulnius is a genus of ray spiders that was first described by Octavius Pickard-Cambridge in 1882.

Species
 it contains eighteen species, found in the Caribbean, South America, Asia, and Panama:
Ogulnius barbandrewsi Miller, Griswold & Yin, 2009 – China
Ogulnius clarus Keyserling, 1886 – Brazil
Ogulnius cubanus Archer, 1958 – Cuba
Ogulnius fulvus Bryant, 1945 – Hispaniola
Ogulnius gertschi Archer, 1953 – Panama
Ogulnius gloriae (Petrunkevitch, 1930) – Puerto Rico
Ogulnius hapalus Zhao & Li, 2012 – China
Ogulnius hayoti Lopez, 1994 – Martinique
Ogulnius infumatus Simon, 1898 – St. Vincent
Ogulnius laranka Dupérré & Tapia, 2017 – Ecuador
Ogulnius latus Bryant, 1948 – Hispaniola
Ogulnius obscurus Keyserling, 1886 – Peru, Brazil
Ogulnius obtectus O. Pickard-Cambridge, 1882 (type) – Brazil, Colombia, Peru
Ogulnius paku Dupérré & Tapia, 2017 – Ecuador
Ogulnius pallisteri Archer, 1953 – Peru
Ogulnius pullus Bösenberg & Strand, 1906 – Korea, Japan
Ogulnius tetrabunus (Archer, 1965) – Jamaica
Ogulnius yaginumai Brignoli, 1981 – Philippines

In synonymy:
O. agnoscus Strand, 1918 = Ogulnius pullus Bösenberg & Strand, 1906

See also
 List of Theridiosomatidae species

References

Further reading

Araneomorphae genera
Spiders of Asia
Spiders of Central America
Spiders of South America
Spiders of the Caribbean
Taxa named by Octavius Pickard-Cambridge
Theridiosomatidae